Lorne Dach (born 1957 or 1958) is a Canadian politician who was elected in the 2015 Alberta general election to the Legislative Assembly of Alberta representing the electoral district of Edmonton-McClung and was re-elected on April 16, 2019.

Personal life 
Dach has a Bachelor of Arts in Political Science from the University of Alberta.

Before being elected, Dach spent 30 years in the real estate business industry as an Associate Broker.

Dach has volunteered for homeEd on their board of directors, city of Edmonton Non-Profit Housing Corporation and as a probation officer with Alberta Solicitor General's court intake unit.

Electoral history

2019 general election

2015 general election

2012 general election

2004 general election

2001 general election

References

1950s births
Alberta New Democratic Party MLAs
Living people
Politicians from Edmonton
21st-century Canadian politicians